Eddie Samuel Obong Watson Jr. (born May 22, 1980) is a Liberian-born Ghanaian actor and producer. He received his first Ghanaian Movie Award in 2014 for his film Ebola which he wrote, directed and produced.

Career
Watson's professional acting career started in 2010 with Labour of Love. He later went on the same year to star in the African war movie, Somewhere in Africa, where he had a supporting role. Costar Majid Michel suggested Watson to the director, Frank Rajah, for the role of a new character being introduced in the sequel 4Play Reloaded of the already popular 4Play by Venus Films. His supporting role in Frank Rajah’s Somewhere in Africa earned him a nomination at the Nollywood & African Films Critics Awards (NAFCA).

The following year, Watson had roles in movies like A Reason to Kill and Single Six and by 2011 the actor has made his first move into Nollywood when he starred alongside Queen Nwokoye in Desperate Heart. With movies like Single and Married in 2012, House of Gold, Letters to My Mother and Purple Rose in 2013 the actor soon became a house-hold name in African entertainment.

The year 2014, was a bitter sweet year for Watson. West Africa and Watson's home country, Liberia, which was one of the worst affected by the Ebola virus.  Watson wrote, produced and directed the short film, Ebola. The year also brought many nominations for the actor for different roles in films such as Bachelors, Sister at War and Purple Rose. And for the first time he was nominated in two different categories for the Ghana Movie Award . The actor has now produced two major movies; Jack & Jill and She Prayed. On Saturday, December 5, 2015, Eddie Watson premiered She Prayed in Sierra Leone with support from some of the cast and other African movie stars including Majid Michel, Beverly Osu and Melvin Oduah. The screening of She Prayed is said to be the biggest show in all the premieres and all international shows in 2015 in Sierra Leone. The movie banked an impressive 98% hold of its premiere rating.

Personal life 
Eddie Watson married his partner of two years, actress Naomi Baaba Watson, in a private ceremony. The couple welcomed their first child, Emirror (Emi) Cassia Watson on February 2, 2015. Watson took to his Instagram page to share the passing of his mother Leonora Caulker on May 27, 2021.

Humanitarian causes
Eddie Watson's documentary film "Ebola" was one of his humanitarian efforts after the outbreak hit West Africa in 2014. The film was meant to educate people in areas affected by the disease. The film was totally financed by Eddie Watson himself and was distributed to most media houses in countries affected plus others in the region of publication and also throughout the internet without a single charge from the actor. He launched the “We Need Help-Ebola Campaign” the same year the film was shot with the Twitter hashtag #WeNeedHelpEbola. The Ebola documentary film starred some popular faces in Ghana’s movie and music industries including Yvonne Nelson and Sarkodie and more. Later that year, the film went on to win Best Short Film Movie at the Ghana Movie Awards (GMA).

Filmography
List of Selected Movies

Television

Awards and nominations

References

External links
 

Living people
1980 births
People from Monrovia
Ghanaian film producers
Ghanaian male film actors
21st-century Ghanaian male actors
Ghanaian people of Liberian descent